Zeynalan or Zeynlan may refer to:
 Zeynalan-e Olya
 Zeynalan-e Olya, Jalalvand
 Zeynalan-e Pain
 Zeynalan-e Sofla